HD 168443 b is a planet with a minimum mass seven times as that of Jupiter. Given the high mass, this planet is likely to be a gas giant, or possibly a small brown dwarf depending on the orbital inclination. It orbits closer to its star than Mercury does to the Sun, and its surface temperature is likely to be very high. It was discovered in 1999 using radial velocity measurements taken at the W. M. Keck Observatory in Hawaii.

References

External links
 

Serpens (constellation)
Giant planets
Exoplanets discovered in 1998
Exoplanets detected by radial velocity